Jorge López Caballero (born 15 August 1981) is a Colombian footballer.

He played for the Colombia national football team in the 2003 FIFA Confederations Cup and the qualifiers for the 2006 FIFA World Cup.

References

1981 births
Living people
Colombian footballers
Colombia international footballers
Deportivo Cali footballers
Millonarios F.C. players
Deportivo Pereira footballers
Boyacá Chicó F.C. footballers
Maccabi Netanya F.C. players
Yaracuyanos FC players
Categoría Primera A players
Israeli Premier League players
2003 FIFA Confederations Cup players
Colombian expatriate footballers
Expatriate footballers in Israel
Expatriate footballers in Venezuela
Association football midfielders
Footballers from Cali